The Institute for Theoretical Computer Science (ITCS) is a scholastic research institute headed by Professor Andrew Yao at Tsinghua University in Beijing. In 2010, the institute became part of Tsinghua University's Institute for Interdisciplinary Information Sciences.

The ITCS has hosted several academic events, including the tenth International Conference on Theory and Practice of Public-Key Cryptography (PKC) on April 16–20, 2007.

External links
ITCS homepage

Tsinghua University
Research institutes in China